Turrell may refer to
Margaret Hoberg Turrell, composer
Turrell, Arkansas, a city in the United States
Turrell School District
Old Turrell City Hall
Salmon Turrell Farmstead, a historic home and farm in Indiana, U.S.
Turrell (name)
Smoove & Turrell, a British musical group
Accles-Turrell, an English automobile built c.1900